Nancy Marie Wickwire (November 20, 1925 – July 10, 1974) was an American stage and television actress known for her roles on several daytime soap operas.

Early years 
Nancy Wickwire was born in 1925 in Harrisburg, Pennsylvania, the younger child of two daughters of Ruth Marie (née Larson) and Alva Burton Wickwire, who was a traveling manager with Railway Express Agency. Wickwire was a graduate of the John Harris High School (1943) and earned a Bachelor of Science from the Carnegie Institute of Technology (1948).

Wickwire acted in productions at her high school, in the Harrisburg Community Theater, and on radio station WSBA. She also studied acting at Old Vic School in London, England (1949-1951).

Television 
Wickwire's television debut came on Omnibus. She appeared on Guiding Light (Lila Taylor Kelly, 1954–1955), As the World Turns (Claire English Lowell Cassen, 1960–1964), Another World (Liz Matthews, 1969–1971), and Days of Our Lives (Phyllis Anderson, 1972–73).

In addition, she made guest appearances on a number of prime time series, including Route 66, The Fugitive, The Invaders, Ironside and Gunsmoke (where she starred as “Nell”, a psychotic, over protective and over religious older sister in the 1963 episode “My Sister’s Keeper” - S9E6).  Her last appearance was in a 1973 episode of Barnaby Jones.

She also starred in a dramatic program for the British Broadcasting Corporation.

Stage 
Wickwire acted in summer stock theatre productions in Plymouth, Massachusetts, and Syracuse, New York. Her Broadway debut came in Saint Joan (1951). Her other Broadway credits include Here's Where I Belong (1965), The Impossible Years (1965), Traveller Without Luggage (1964), Abraham Cochrane (1964), The Golden Age (1963), Seidman and Son (1962), Measure for Measure (1957), and The Grand Prize (1955). 

For two summers, she acted in productions at the American Shakespeare Festival in Stratford, Connecticut.

Personal life and death
Wickwire was married to director Basil Langton. In July 1974, at age 48, Wickwire died of cancer at Mount Zion Hospital in San Francisco, California.

References

External links

1925 births
1974 deaths
American soap opera actresses
American television actresses
Actors from Harrisburg, Pennsylvania
Deaths from cancer in California
20th-century American actresses